Notogomphus maathaiae, commonly known as Maathai’s longleg, is a species of dragonfly in the clubtail family Gomphidae. It is thought to be endemic montane streams in Kenya.
The species is considered endangered because the continued destruction of its montane forest habitat by humans creates a very high risk of extinction in the near future.

The species was described by Viola Clausnitzer and Klaas-Douwe B. Dijkstra in 2005. They named it in honor of Wangari Maathai, founder of the Green Belt Movement and the first African woman to receive a Nobel Peace Prize.

See also
 List of organisms named after famous people (born 1900–1949)

References

Endemic fauna of Kenya
Insects of Kenya
Gomphidae
Insects described in 2005
Taxonomy articles created by Polbot